is a Japanese martial art blanket term for any combat skill, technique or system of martial art using body movements that are described as an empty-hand combat skill or system. Taijutsu is a synonym for Jujutsu (method of unarmed or with minor weapons close combat). The words jujutsu, taijutsu, and yawara can be used interchangeably. The term is commonly used when referring to a traditional Japanese martial art but has also been used in the naming of modern martial arts such as Gendai Goshin Jutsu, Yamabujin Goshin-Jutsu and Bujinkan Budo Taijutsu. Taijutsu is similar to Karate but is more focused on the body techniques. More specific names than taijutsu are typically used when describing a martial art: Judo (focusing on throwing and grappling), Aikido (focusing on throwing and joint locks) as well as Karate and Kenpō (focusing on striking).

In popular culture
 The Japanese anime and manga Naruto mentions Taijutsu as one of the three basic ninja methods, the others being Ninjutsu and Genjutsu.

See also
AKBAN
Bujinkan
To-Shin Do
Ninjutsu
Yamabujin-Goshinjutsu

References

Japanese martial arts

Ninjutsu skills